Folkism may refer to:

A concept in Nigerian theater studies coined by Sam Ukala
Political affiliation with the Folkspartei, an early 20th century Jewish autonomist party in Eastern Europe
Völkisch movement, a German ethnic nationalist movement